Le Chevalier de Maison-Rouge (translated as The Knight of Maison-Rouge: A Novel of Marie Antoinette or The Knight of the Red House) was written in 1845 by Alexandre Dumas, père. The novel takes place shortly after the end of the series, following the death of Louis XVI. Set in Paris during the Reign of Terror, the novel follows the adventures of a brave young man named Maurice Lindey who unwittingly implicates himself in a Royalist plot to rescue Marie Antoinette from prison. Maurice is devoted to the Republican cause, but his infatuation with a beautiful young woman leads him into the service of the mysterious Knight of Maison-Rouge, the mastermind behind the plot.

Alexandre Dumas based events in the novel on "", an attempt by the Marquis Alexandre Gonsse de Rougeville to communicate with Marie Antoinette by hiding a secret message in the petals of a carnation. According to the biography La vie d'Alexandre Dumas père by J. Lucas-Dubreton, Dumas had originally titled the work Le Chevalier de Rougeville, but changed the title to Le Chevalier de Maison-Rouge after receiving a complaint from the son of the Marquis de Rougeville.

Bibliography
English translation of La vie d'Alexandre Dumas père by J. Lucas-Dubreton

External links

 (French)

1845 French novels
Novels by Alexandre Dumas
Novels set in the French Revolution
Novels set in Paris
Cultural depictions of Louis XVI
Cultural depictions of Marie Antoinette